Kuo Koul-hwa (born 19 November 1968) is a Taiwanese alpine skier. He competed in the men's giant slalom at the 1988 Winter Olympics.

References

1968 births
Living people
Taiwanese male alpine skiers
Olympic alpine skiers of Taiwan
Alpine skiers at the 1988 Winter Olympics
Place of birth missing (living people)